Ken A. Roberts (born August 5, 1963) is an American politician who served as a member of the Idaho House of Representatives from 2000 to 2012. He later served as chairman of the Idaho State Tax Commission until April 2019.

Early life and education
Roberts was born in Cascade, Idaho. He attended Boise State University, Moody Bible Institute, and the University of Idaho.

Elections
2012 Roberts won the three-way May 15, 2012, Republican primary, winning with 3,290 votes (44.9%), facing Democratic nominee Karla Miller for the general election on November 6, 2012.
2000 When Republican Representative Christian Zimmermann left the District 8 A seat open, Roberts won the May 23, 2000, Republican primary with 5,901 votes (81.8%) against Lloyd Blackmer, winning the November 7, 2000, general election with 10,732 votes (69.8%) against Jerry Lockhart (D).
2002 Unopposed for the May 28, 2002, Republican primary, Roberts won with 4,963 votes; Lockhart was unopposed in the Democratic primary, setting up a rematch. Roberts won the November 5, 2002, general election with 8,314 votes (60.5%) against Lockhart.
2004 Unopposed for the May 25, 2004, Republican primary, Roberts won with 5,565 votes, and won the November 2, 2004, general election with 10,058 votes (57.4%) against Darcy James (D).
2006 Unopposed for the May 23, 2006, Republican primary, Roberts won with 4,158 votes; James was unopposed for the Democratic primary, setting up a rematch. Roberts won the November 7, 2006, general election with 7,655 votes (53.00%) against James.
2008 Unopposed for the May 27, 2008, Republican primary, Roberts won with 4,282 votes, and won the November 4, 2008, general election with 11,043 votes (59.7%) against Richard Adams (D).
2010 Roberts won the May 25, 2010, Republican primary with 4,397 votes (69.6%) against Gordon Conrad, and was unopposed for the November 2, 2010, general election, winning with 11,486 votes.

References

External links
Ken A. Roberts at the Idaho Legislature
 

1953 births
Living people
Boise State University alumni
Republican Party members of the Idaho House of Representatives
Moody Bible Institute alumni
People from Cascade, Idaho
University of Idaho alumni
State cabinet secretaries of Idaho